Paragahawela is a village in Sri Lanka. It is located within Matale District, Central Province. It is located in Ukuwela-Elkaduwa road (B180) about 1 kilometer from Ukuwela. The population of the village, according to the 2012 census, was 2,168.

Demographics
The majority of the people living in Paragahawela are Muslims. Tamil is the major language spoken in Paragahawela by the majority of the population.

Local Government Council
Paragahawela is governed by the Ukuwela Pradeshiya Sabha.

See also
List of towns in Central Province, Sri Lanka

External links

Populated places in Matale District